Daniel Johnston Riddiford  (11 March 1914 – 26 October 1974) was a New Zealand politician of the National Party.

Biography

Early life
Riddiford was born in Featherston in 1914 a grandson of "King" Riddiford and Sydney Johnston of Oruawharo. He was educated in the UK at Downside School, Somerset, and New College, Oxford. He gained an MA in Modern Greats from Oxford, and also an LLB from the University of New Zealand. From 1932 to 1937, he farmed in the Wairarapa on family-owned land.

For a number of years Riddiford was also a director of The Dominion newspaper (now The Dominion Post).

Military service
He joined the New Zealand Expeditionary Force in 1939 and was an officer with the Royal Regiment of New Zealand Artillery. He was a prisoner of war in Italy from 1941 until his escape in 1943. He was awarded the MC in World War II. From 1946, he had a law practice in Wellington.

Political career

Riddiford's win in Wellington Central was considered a surprise as the electorate had been held by Labour for the previous 42 years as well as Riddiford's rather aristocratic manner of campaigning which many thought unsuitable within an urban liberal electorate. In 1970 he suffered a heart attack. Riddiford would remain in Parliament until 1972, when he retired and succeeded by Ken Comber. Under Keith Holyoake, he was Minister of Justice (1969–1972) and Attorney-General (1971–1972).

Family 
Earle Riddiford a notable New Zealand mountaineer and a lawyer was a cousin.

Notes

References

|-

|-

1914 births
1974 deaths
New Zealand National Party MPs
Members of the Cabinet of New Zealand
New Zealand military personnel of World War II
People educated at Downside School
Members of the New Zealand House of Representatives
New Zealand MPs for Wellington electorates
Attorneys-General of New Zealand
Alumni of New College, Oxford
University of New Zealand alumni
New Zealand prisoners of war in World War II
New Zealand recipients of the Military Cross
People from Featherston, New Zealand
20th-century New Zealand lawyers
Unsuccessful candidates in the 1957 New Zealand general election
Dan
Justice ministers of New Zealand
Johnston family